Laila Majnu is a 1950 Indian Tamil-language historical romance film directed by F. Nagoor. Based on the Persian tale of Layla and Majnun, the film stars T. R. Mahalingam and M. V. Rajamma as the title characters. It was released on 1 March 1950.

Plot

Cast 

Male cast
T. R. Mahalingam as Khayas
N. S. Krishnan as Anvar
S. V. Sahasranamam as Salam
R. Balasubramaniam as Sardar
G. M. Basheer as Amir Amri
K. P. Kamakshias Moulvi Sahib
Radhakrishnan as Mohideen
Duraipandian as Syed
Hariharan as Sardar's friend
Thiruvenkatam as Adil
George Thorpe as Kapoor
M. R. Krishnasami & Party as Stunt

Female cast
M. V. Rajamma as Laila
T. A. Mathuram as Noor Jahan
V. N. Janaki as Zarina
P. S. Sivabhagyam as Zahira
T. S. Jaya as Moulvi's Wife
K. T. Dhanalakshmi as Hamida
Kannamba as Salima
C. R. Rajakumari as Young Khayas
Kusalakumari as Young Laila
Dance
Lalitha & Padmini

Production 
Laila Majnu is based on the Arabic tale of Layla and Majnun. The film was produced and directed by F. Nagoor under the banner Balaji Pictures and was funded by M. K. Thyagaraja Bhagavathar. The famous writer Vallikkannan wrote the dialogues. Cinematography was by Jitten Bannerji and the operative cameraman was P. S. Selvaraj. V. B. Nataraja Mudaliar did the editing. Art direction was also done by F. Nagoor. Choreography was by Hiralal, Ganesh and Joshi. The film was shot at Newtone studios and the stills were taken by R. N. Nagaraja Rao and Gnanam.

Soundtrack 
Music was composed by S. V. Venkatraman, while the lyrics were penned by Lakshmanadas and Kambadasan.

Release 
Laila Majnu was released on 1 March 1950, and did not do well at the box office.

References 

1950 films
1950 romantic drama films
1950s Tamil-language films
Films scored by S. V. Venkatraman
Indian historical romance films
Indian romantic drama films